Sacred Heart, Jiaojiang District is a Roman Catholic church located in Haimen Subdistrict of Jiaojiang District, Taizhou, Zhejiang, China.

History
The church was originally built by French missionary Li Sicong (1864–1930) in 1894, during the reign of Guangxu Emperor (1875–1908) of the Qing dynasty (1644–1911). 

In 1926, it became a Duomo of the Roman Catholic Diocese of Linhai. 

After the founding of the Communist State in 1949, it was taken as property of the People's Liberation Army and then as class rooms of Yucai School. During the Cultural Revolution, the church was slightly damaged by the Red Guards. After the 3rd Plenary Session of the 11th Central Committee of the Chinese Communist Party, according to the national policy of free religious belief, the church was officially reopened to the public in 1987.

In 2010, Anthony Xu Jiwei,was ordained at the church (Duomo) as Bishop of the Roman Catholic Diocese of Linhai, with the approval of the Holy See.

Architecture
The church was built of bricks and cement.

Gallery

References

Churches in Zhejiang
Tourist attractions in Taizhou, Zhejiang
1894 establishments in China
19th-century Roman Catholic church buildings in China
Roman Catholic cathedrals in China
Roman Catholic churches completed in 1894